The Canal Age is a term of art used by historians of Science, Technology, and Industry. Various parts of the world have had various canal ages; the main ones belong to civilizations (Egypt, Ancient Babylon), dynastic Empires of India, China, Southeast Asia, and mercantile Europe. Cultures make canals as they make other engineering works, and canals make cultures. They make industry, and until the era when steam locomotives attained high speeds and power, the canal was by far the fastest way to travel long distances quickly. Commercial canals generally had boatmen shifts that kept the barges moving behind mule teams 24 hours a day. Like many North American canals of the 1820s-1840s, the canal operating companies partnered with or founded short feeder railroads to connect to their sources or markets. Two good examples of this were funded by private enterprise:
 The Lehigh Coal & Navigation Company used vertically integrated mining raw materials, transporting them, manufacturing with them, and merchandising by building coal mines, the instrumental Lehigh Canal, and feeding their own iron goods manufacturing industries and assuaging the American Republic's first energy crisis by increasing coal production from 1820 onwards using the nation's second constructed railway, the Summit Hill and Mauch Chunk Railroad.
 The second coal road and canal system was inspired by LC&N's success. The Delaware and Hudson Canal and Delaware and Hudson Gravity Railroad. The LC&N operation was aimed at supplying the country's premier city, Philadelphia with much needed fuel. The D&H companies were founded purposefully to supply the explosively growing city of New York's energy needs.
Together, they and the Schuylkill Canal-Reading Railroad would supply and transport the majority of Anthracite needed by northern industries in the early North American Industrial Revolution. Unlike Europe, America did not have canals for several hundred years before industrialization. In North America, everything was developed simultaneously.

Early railroads in North America made many canals economically feasible, and canal's needs added to the demands by industries that pushed the early railroads into pressurized research and development and rapid steady improvements.

Canal Age in Asia

European Canal Age

North American Canal Age

Technology Archaeologists and Industrial Historians date the American Canal Age from 1790 to 1855 based on momentum and new construction activity, since many of the older canals, however limited later by locks that restricted boat sizes below the most economic capacities and well-behind later-developing technological capabilities, nonetheless continued on in service well into the twentieth century.

The first legislation supporting canals in North America was passed in 1762 in the Province of Pennsylvania to improve navigation on the Schuylkill River through Philadelphia, the largest city in North America. It provided for the surveying of a lock canal along the Schuylkill tributary Tulpehocken Creek; this would be built between 1782 and 1828 as the Union Canal, part of the omnibus Pennsylvania legislative package, the Main Line of Public Works, and was the only water route connecting the Susquehanna and Delaware Rivers above the Chesapeake Bay.

Next up there were numerous schemes and bills placed before the Pennsylvania assembly in the 1790-1816 time frame to improve navigation on the Susquehanna, Schuylkill and Lehigh Rivers, the first being the Schuylkill and Susquehanna Navigation Company in 1791. They consumed private capital and public monies, but were little successful. Concurrently, the predecessor of the Erie Canal was begun in New York State and in New England, Connecticut and Massachusetts were looking at a few waterways needing better navigability. Not much happened. The Lehigh Canal came about when the last of these licenses, awarded in 1816, expired in early 1818 with virtually nothing to show for the funds spent. This expiration allowed the state to give rights-of-way to the Lehigh Navigation Company in March 1818, founded by two disgruntled formerly enthusiastic backers of the Schuylkill Canal which was chartered in 1812 but like the earlier Lehigh River projects, languished lazily, only raising a small amount of new funds annually, and getting only a little amount of work done accordingly. Josiah White and partner Erskine Hazard needing fuel for their wire mill and nail factory at the falls of the Schuylkill fought this plodding method of incremental improvement for years.

By 1855, canals were no longer the civil engineering work of first resort, for it was nearly always better—cheaper to build a railroad above ground than it was to dig a watertight ditch 6–8 feet (2–3 m) deep and provide it with water and make annual repairs for ice and freshet damages—even though the cost per ton mile on a canal was often cheaper in an operational sense, canals couldn't be built along hills and dales, nor backed into odd corners, as could a railroad siding.

Background

From the first days of the expansion of the British colonies from the coast of North America into the heartland of the continent, a recurring problem was that of transportation between the coastal ports and the interior. This was not unique to the Americas, and the problem still exists in those parts of the world where muscle power provides a primary means of transportation within a region. An equally ancient solution was implemented in many cultures — things in the water weighed far less and took less effort to move since friction became negligible.

name=FiveXings>The five east-west crossings of the Appalachians are South to North: Plains of Georgia, Alabama, and Mississippi (around the bottom),  the Cumberland Gap pass connecting North Carolina/Southern Virginia with Kentucky/Tennessee,  the Cumberland Narrows pass connecting Cumberland Western Maryland/Northern Virginia with West Virginia and Western Pennsylvania via Brownsville, Pennsylvania and the Monongahela River or the Youghiogheny River valley (both of the Ohio & Mississippi river system),  the gaps of the Allegheny connecting the Susquehanna River Valley in central Pennsylvania with the Allegheny River valley (and again the Ohio Country),  and lastly, the Mohawk River water gap and valley tributary of the Hudson River, creating what later advertising would call the level water route westwards.

</ref> presented a great challenge. Passengers and freight had to travel overland, a journey made more difficult by the rough condition of the roads. In 1800, it typically took 2.5 weeks to travel overland from New York to Cleveland, Ohio []; 4 weeks to Detroit [].

The principal exportable product of the Ohio Valley was grain, which was a high-volume, low-priced commodity, bolstered by supplies from the coast. Frequently it was not worth the cost of transporting it to far-away population centers. This was a factor leading to farmers in the west turning their grains into whiskey for easier transport and higher sales, and later the Whiskey Rebellion. In the 18th and early 19th centuries, it became clear to coastal residents that the city or state that succeeded in developing a cheap, reliable route to the West would enjoy economic success, and the port at the seaward end of such a route would see business increase greatly. In time, projects were devised in Virginia, Maryland, Pennsylvania, and relatively deep into the coastal states.

Proposals

Early proposals
The successes of the Canal du Midi in France (1681), Bridgewater Canal in Britain (fully completed 1769), and Eiderkanal (superseded by today's Kiel Canal) in Denmark (later Germany) (1784) spurred on what was called in Britain "canal mania". The idea of a canal to tie the East Coast to the new western settlements was already in the air by 1724: New York provincial official Cadwallader Colden made a passing reference (in a report on fur trading) to improving the natural waterways of western New York.

Two men, Gouverneur Morris and Elkanah Watson, were early proponents of a canal along the Mohawk River. Their efforts led to the creation of the Western and Northern Inland Lock Navigation Companies in 1792 (which took the first steps to improve navigation on the Mohawk and construct a canal between the Mohawk and Lake Ontario), but the company proved that private financing was insufficient.

Potomac/Patowmack precedent
George Washington led a partly enduring effort to turn the Potomac River into a navigable link to the west, sinking substantial energy and capital into the Patowmack Canal from 1785 until his death fourteen years later.

By 1788 Washington's Potomac Company was successful in constructing five locks which took boats  past the Potomac Great Falls. The Chesapeake and Ohio Canal superseded the Potomac Canal in 1823.

Christopher Colles (who was familiar with the Bridgewater Canal) surveyed the Mohawk Valley, and made a presentation to the New York state legislature in 1784 proposing a canal from Lake Ontario. The proposal drew attention and some action but was never implemented.

Scheme
Jesse Hawley finally got the canal built. He had envisioned encouraging the growing of large quantities of grain on the Western New York plains (then largely unsettled) for sale on the Eastern seaboard. However, he went bankrupt trying to ship grain to the coast. While in Canandaigua debtors' prison, Hawley began pressing for the construction of a canal along the -long Mohawk River valley with support from Joseph Ellicott (agent for the Holland Land Company in Batavia). Ellicott realized that a canal would add value to the land he was selling in the western part of the state. He later became the first canal commissioner.

Engineering requirements
The Mohawk River (a tributary of the Hudson) rises near Lake Ontario and runs in a glacial meltwater channel just north of the Catskill range of the Appalachian Mountains, separating them from the geologically distinct Adirondacks to the north. The Mohawk and Hudson valleys form the only cut across the Appalachians north of Alabama, allowing an almost complete water route from New York City in the south to Lakes Ontario and Erie in the west. Along its course and from these lakes, other Great Lakes, and to a lesser degree, related rivers, a large part of the continent's interior (and many settlements) would be made well connected to the Eastern seaboard.

Such a canal would be expensive to build even with modern technology; in 1800, the expense was barely imaginable. President Thomas Jefferson called it "a little short of madness" and rejected it; however, Hawley interested New York Governor DeWitt Clinton in the project. There was much opposition, and the project was ridiculed as "Clinton's folly" and "Clinton's ditch." In 1817, though, Clinton received approval from the legislature for $7 million for construction.

Its construction, through limestone and mountains, proved a daunting task. The canal was built using some of the most advanced engineering technology from Holland. In 1823 construction reached the Niagara Escarpment, necessitating the building of five locks along a  corridor to carry the canal over the escarpment. To move earth, animals pulled a "slip scraper" (similar to a bulldozer). The sides of the canal were lined with stone set in clay, and the bottom was also lined with clay. The stonework required hundreds of German masons, who later built many of New York's buildings. All labor on the canal depended upon human (and animal) power or the force of water. As the canal progressed, the crews and engineers working on the project developed expertise and became a skilled labor force.

Operation

This canal has one towpath generally on the north side. When canal boats met, the boat with the right of way remained on the towpath side of the canal. The other boat steered toward the berm (or heelpath) side of the canal. The driver (or "hoggee", pronounced HO-gee) of the privileged boat kept his towpath team by the canalside edge of the towpath, while the hoggee of the other boat moved to the outside of the towpath and stopped his team. His towline would be unravelled from the horses, go slack, fall into the water and sink to the bottom while his boat decelerated on with its remaining momentum. The privileged boat's team would step over the other boat's towline with their horses pulling the boat over the sunken towline without stopping. Once clear, the other boat's team would continue on its way.

Pulled by teams of horses canal boats still moved slowly but methodically shrinking time and distance. Efficiently, the nonstop smooth method of transportation cut nearly in half the travel time between Albany and Buffalo moving day and night. Venturing West men and women boarded packets to visit relatives or solely for a relaxing excursion. Emigrants took passage on freight boats camping on deck or on top of crates. Packet boats serving passengers exclusively reached speeds of up to five miles an hour and ran at much more frequent intervals than cramped, bumpy stages.

Packet boats measuring up to seventy-eight feet in length and fourteen and a half feet across made ingenious use of space in order to accommodate up to forty passengers at night and up to three times as many in the daytime. The best examples furnished with carpeted floors, stuffed chairs, and mahogany tables stocked with current newspapers and books served as sitting rooms during the days. At mealtimes crews transformed the cabin into dining rooms. Drawing a curtain across the width of the room divided the cabin into ladies' and gentlemen's sleeping quarters in the evening hours. Pull down tiered beds folded from the walls and additional cots could be hung from hooks in the ceiling. Some captains hired musicians and held dances. The canal had brought civilization into the wilderness.

The Lehigh and Erie Canals
Two early 19th century canals had inordinately large impacts on the demographic and industrial development of the United States. The daring Erie Canal, begun in 1815 after a decade of debate and contemplation was a bid to join the port of New York City to the promise of the Great Lakes, just then undergoing rapid settlement as the 1779 Sullivan Expedition had brushed aside the Iroquois and opened the Northwest Territory to settlement.

The Lehigh Canal

Perhaps in part inspired by the news of the Erie's technological achievements, the privately funded Lehigh Canal was an achievement brought about by the energy needs of two visionary industrialists, the politically connected Erskine Hazard and his older partner Josiah White, who together built the Lehigh Canal and the Lehigh Coal & Navigation Company, founding towns, mines, and building economically productive mining and transportation infrastructure from a wilderness in Eastern Pennsylvania south and west of the Poconos in the anthracite creating folded ridges of the Ridge and Valley Appalachians. Not a true canal, the Lehigh navigation was the type of canal built along the line of a river valley within its drainage basin and parallel to the fall of the watercourse. The Lehigh Canal for a time was two separate civil engineering projects constructed 20 years apart that stretched over two parts of the Lehigh River and totaling  along the Lehigh River in eastern Pennsylvania.

Pictures

See also
 Canal Mania
 Delaware and Lehigh National Heritage Corridor

Notes

References

External links
 Canal & River Trust's Canal history
 The Canal Age, History of transport 1760-1840
 National Canal Museum: Lehigh Navigation
 Historic photos of the Lehigh Coal and Navigation Canal
 Delaware & Lehigh Canal State Heritage Corridor
 Lehigh Canal History

Aqueducts in the United States
Navigable aqueducts
Canals in Pennsylvania
Canals on the National Register of Historic Places in Pennsylvania
Archaeological sites on the National Register of Historic Places in Pennsylvania
Historic American Engineering Record in Pennsylvania
Transportation in Pennsylvania
Transportation in the United States
Canals opened in 1829
Historic districts on the National Register of Historic Places in Pennsylvania
National Register of Historic Places in Carbon County, Pennsylvania
National Register of Historic Places in Luzerne County, Pennsylvania
Aqueducts on the National Register of Historic Places